Herren is a surname. Notable people with the surname include:

Albert Herren (born 1952), American politician
Andy Herren (born 1986), American Big Brother winner
Chris Herren (born 1975), American basketball player
Greg Herren (born 1961), American writer
Hans Rudolf Herren (born 1947), Swiss entomologist and farmer
Madeleine Herren (born 1956), Swiss historian
Scott Herren, American musician and music producer
Thomas W. Herren (1895–1985), United States Army general